TMF Group is a multinational professional services firm headquartered in Amsterdam, Netherlands. The independent group provides accounting, tax, HR and payroll services to businesses operating on an international scale. TMF Group, with 125 offices in 83 jurisdictions, employing approximately 7,800 people, provides compliance and administrative services to over 15,000 clients in a €10 billion market. It also has over €125 billion in Assets Under Administration (AUA).

History 

The company was founded in The Netherlands in 1988. Between 2006 and 2009, when Pernille Fabricius sat as group CFO & COO and board member, TMF Group made 47 acquisitions including departments of Ernst & Young, KPMG, Grant Thornton and Baker Tilly in countries like Brazil, Argentina, Mexico, China and Australia.

In October 2008, British private equity firm Doughty Hanson & Co bought TMF Group for €750 million. In January 2011, Doughty Hanson completed its €350 million acquisition of Equity Trust. This paved the way for TMF Group's merger with Equity Trust, which was completed at group level in June 2011.

In 2015, TMF Group acquired the Brazilian business process outsourcing unit from PwC, including delivery centers in Barueri, Rio de Janeiro and Ribeirão Preto, providing business process outsourcing services in finance & accounting, human resources, tax and compliance. In 2017, TMF GROUP was acquired by CVC Capital partners.

On 11 August 2021, according to a report published by the Budgetary Monitoring Forum (FMO), a Dutch appeals court upheld a fine imposed by the De Nederlandsche Bank (DNB) against the TMF group for failings in due diligence related to the scandal of Mozambique's hidden debts. The scandal involved at least three corrupt officials from Credit Suisse, who have admitted to taking bribes, and officials of the Abu Dhabi based group, Privinvest, notably Jean Boustani.

Service lines 
The group's main services are accounting, tax, HR, payroll, and corporate secretarial.

Other services relates to structured finance, international structuring, international incorporations, fund administration, private equity, real estate investments and IP licensing and collection.

References

External links
TMF Group

Financial services companies established in 1988
Consulting firms established in 1988
Accounting firms of the Netherlands
International management consulting firms
Companies based in Amsterdam
Management consulting firms of the Netherlands
1988 establishments in the Netherlands
Companies established in 1988